Ezequiel Skverer (born February 24, 1989) is an Israeli-Argentinian former professional basketball player.

Early life
Skverer is Jewish, he was born in Bahía Blanca, Argentina. Skverer lived his first 4 years in Argentina before growing up in Karmiel, Israel. He played for Ironi Nahariya youth team.

Skverer was later joined Maccabi Tel Aviv youth team and helped them to win the Championship and State Cup titles in 2007.

Professional career
In 2007, Skverer started his professional career with Maccabi Tel Aviv. On December 28, 2007, Skverer parted ways with Maccabi and joined Maccabi Givat Shmuel / Habika of the Liga Leumit.

In his fourth season with Habikaa, Skverer helped them to promote to the Israeli Premier League after they swept Hapoel Tel Aviv 3–0 in the best-of-five series.

In his fifth season with Habikaa, Skverer was named Israeli Young Player of the Month for games played in November  and participated in the 2012 Israeli All-Star Game. Skverer finished the season averaging 6.7 points and 3 assists per game and was named Israeli League Rising Star.

On July 4, 2013, Skverer signed a two-year deal with Hapoel Holon.

On July 16, 2014, Skverer signed a two-year deal with Hapoel Tel Aviv, joining his former head coach Oded Kattash.

On June 24, 2015, Skverer signed a two-year deal with Ironi Nes Ziona.

On August 3, 2016, Skverer signed with Hapoel Gilboa Galil for the 2016–17 season. On November 5, 2016, Skverer recorded a career-high 21 points, shooting 8-of-13 from the field, along with 3 rebounds and 2 assists in a 73–75 loss to Maccabi Rishon LeZion. On April 18, 2017, Skverer participated in the 2017 Israeli All-Star Game. Skverer played 32 games for Gilboa Galil and averaged 8.3 points and 3.3 assists per game.

On July 16, 2017, Skverer signed a two-year contract extension with Gilboa Galil. On March 18, 2018, Skverer suffered a knee injury in a match against Hapoel Jerusalem and later was ruled out for the rest of the season.

On July 28, 2019, Skverer signed a 1+1 deal with Hapoel Afula of the Israeli National League.

Israel national team
Skverer was a member of the Israeli U-18  and U-20 national teams.

See also
List of select Jewish basketball players

References

External links
 RealGM profile
 Safsal profile (in Hebrew)

1989 births
Living people
Argentine men's basketball players
Argentine expatriate sportspeople in Israel
Argentine expatriate basketball people
Argentine emigrants to Israel
Argentine Jews
Jewish Argentine sportspeople
Hapoel Eilat basketball players
Hapoel Gilboa Galil Elyon players
Hapoel Holon players
Hapoel Tel Aviv B.C. players
Ironi Nes Ziona B.C. players
Israeli men's basketball players
Maccabi Givat Shmuel players
Maccabi Tel Aviv B.C. players
Moadon Kadursal HaBikaa players
Point guards
Jewish men's basketball players
Sportspeople from Bahía Blanca